Knapp is a German and English surname. Notable people with the surname include:

 Alexis Knapp (born 1989), American actress
 Andrew Knapp (born 1991), American baseball player
 Anthony Knapp (born 1941), American mathematician
 Bliss Knapp (1877–1958), American Christian Scientist
 Brooke Knapp (born 1940), American aviator and realtor
 Charles Knapp (1868–1936), American classical scholar
 Charles Boynton Knapp (born 1946), American academic 
 Chauncey L. Knapp (1809–1898), American politician 
 Chris Knapp (disambiguation), multiple people
 Edward Knapp (disambiguation), multiple people
 Elizabeth Knapp (17th century), American settler and alleged possession victim  
 Florence Knapp (disambiguation), multiple people
 Gaines A. Knapp (1848–1918), American politician
 Georg Christian Knapp (1753–1825), German theologian
 Georg Friedrich Knapp (1842–1926), German economist
 George Knapp (disambiguation), multiple people
 Greg Knapp (1963–2021), American football coach 
 H. Wallace Knapp (1869–1929), American politician
 Harry Shepard Knapp (1856–1923), American navy admiral 
 Hermann Jakob Knapp (1832–1911), German-American ophthalmologist
 Jennifer Knapp (born 1974), American-Australian  musician
 Joe Knapp, American musician
 John Leonard Knapp (1767–1845), English botanist
 Joseph P. Knapp (1864–1951), American publisher and conservationist
 Justin Knapp (born 1982), Wikipedia editor
 Karin Knapp (born 1987), Italian tennis player
 Louisa Knapp (1851-1910), Columnist and first editor of the Ladies Home Journal
 Lubor Knapp (born 1976), Czech footballer
 Lyman Enos Knapp (1837–1904), American politician
 Mark L. Knapp (born 1938), American academic and author
 Martin Knapp (born 1952), British economist and policy analyst
 Martin Wells Knapp (1853–1901), American minister and founder
 Phoebe Knapp (1839–1908), American composer and musician
 Rick Knapp (born 1961), American baseball coach
 Sandra Knapp (born 1956), British-American botanist
 Seaman A. Knapp (1833–1911), American academic 
 Sebastian Knapp, British actor
 Steve Knapp (born 1964), American race car driver
 Wesley M. Knapp, American botanist
 Whitman Knapp (1909–2004), American judge

German-language surnames
English-language surnames